In 1966, the Supplementary Benefits Commission (part of the National Assistance Board) was merged with the Ministry of Pensions and National Insurance to form the new Ministry of Social Security, as part of the Ministry of Social Security Act 1966.

History
In November 1968, the Ministry of Health and the Ministry of Social Security were merged to create the new Department of Health and Social Security (DHSS).

References

Defunct departments of the Government of the United Kingdom
1966 establishments in the United Kingdom
1968 disestablishments in the United Kingdom